The following women have appeared in the American or international edition of Playboy magazine as Playmate of the Month. Those who were also named Playmate of the Year are highlighted in green. 

A common misconception is that Marilyn Monroe was not a Playmate of the Month. She appeared in the first issue of Playboy as the "Sweetheart of the Month". The term "Playmate" was introduced in the second issue, but that term was applied to Monroe in several later issues.

1954–1959

Note: Ellen Stratton was the first official Playmate of the Year.

1960–1969

1970–1979

1980–1989

1990–1999

2000–2009

2010–2020

2021–

See also 
 List of Playboy models, including all models who have appeared in Playboy
 List of Playboy Playmates of the Year
 List of Penthouse Pets

References 

Playmates of the Month

Lists of female models
American female models